Jack Bruzell (born c. 1938) was a Canadian football player who played for the Winnipeg Blue Bombers. He won the Grey Cup with them in 1959, 1961 and 1962.

References

1930s births
Canadian football people from Winnipeg
Players of Canadian football from Manitoba
Winnipeg Blue Bombers players
Living people